Melhania virescens is a plant in the mallow family Malvaceae, native to southern Africa.

Description
Inflorescences generally have solitary flowers, occasionally two-flowered. The flowers feature yellow petals.

Distribution and habitat
Melhania virescens is native to Botswana, Namibia and South Africa (Cape Provinces, Northern Provinces). Its habitat is in limy soils.

References

External links
 – images

virescens
Flora of Botswana
Flora of Namibia
Flora of the Northern Provinces
Flora of the Cape Provinces
Plants described in 1900
Taxa named by Karl Moritz Schumann